Mylène Lazare (born 20 November 1987, Lagny-sur-Marne) is a French swimmer, who won a bronze medal at the 2012 Summer Olympics in the women's 4 x 200 m freestyle.

References
 http://www.romandie.com/news/n/JO_natation_La_France_decroche_le_bronze_sur_4x200m_nage_libre010820122256.asp Results] at romandie.com

Specific

Living people
1987 births
French female freestyle swimmers
Olympic swimmers of France
Swimmers at the 2012 Summer Olympics
Olympic bronze medalists for France
Olympic bronze medalists in swimming
Medalists at the FINA World Swimming Championships (25 m)
European Aquatics Championships medalists in swimming
Medalists at the 2012 Summer Olympics
Knights of the Ordre national du Mérite
World Aquatics Championships medalists in swimming
Universiade medalists in swimming
People from Lagny-sur-Marne
Sportspeople from Seine-et-Marne
Universiade bronze medalists for France
21st-century French women